"Speechless" is a song by German producer Robin Schulz, featuring vocals from Canadian-Finnish singer Erika Sirola. It was released by Warner Music Group Germany, to digital download and streaming formats, on 16 November 2018. The song was written by Schulz, Chris Braide, Teemu Brunila, Dennis "Junkx" Bierbrodt, Guido Kramer, Jürgen Rohr and Stefan Dabruck. Production was handled by Schulz and Junkx.

Track listings

Charts

Weekly charts

Year-end charts

Certifications

References

2018 songs
2018 singles
Robin Schulz songs
Warner Music Group singles
Songs written by Chris Braide
Songs written by Teemu Brunila
Songs written by Robin Schulz